Silvia Garino (born 24 June 1998) is an Italian badminton player. She won her first senior international title at the 2016 Ethiopia International tournament in the women's doubles event partnered with Lisa Iversen. She and Iversen claimed the women's doubles National Championships title in 2017 and 2018.
In 2019, together with Kevin Strobl, Garino won the title in mixed double at the National Championships.

Achievements

BWF International Challenge/Series (2 titles, 2 runners-up) 
Women's doubles

  BWF International Challenge tournament
  BWF International Series tournament
  BWF Future Series tournament

References

External links 
 
 

1998 births
Living people
People from Acqui Terme
Italian female badminton players
Competitors at the 2018 Mediterranean Games
Badminton players at the 2019 European Games
European Games competitors for Italy
Mediterranean Games competitors for Italy
Sportspeople from the Province of Alessandria
21st-century Italian women